2-Oxohistidine is a form of histidine damaged by reactive oxygen species. It can serve as a biological marker for assessing protein modifications from oxidative stress.

References

Amino acid derivatives